Wild Oats Lane is a 1926 American silent drama film directed by Marshall Neilan and starring Viola Dana, Robert Agnew, and John MacSweeney.

Cast

References

Bibliography
 Goble, Alan. The Complete Index to Literary Sources in Film. Walter de Gruyter, 1999.

External links

1926 films
1926 drama films
Silent American drama films
Films directed by Marshall Neilan
American silent feature films
1920s English-language films
Producers Distributing Corporation films
American black-and-white films
1920s American films